The Z-TER (Z 21500) is a French model of electric multiple unit regional passenger train, manufactured by Alstom and Bombardier Transportation, and operated by SNCF.

They are used on regional links, and can be coupled with another Z-TER. They are derived from the French diesel passenger regional train "X-TER" (X 72500), and is the first regional train to reach 200 km/h.

As other regional trains, they are owned by the French regions, and are dispatched as :
 19 "Pays de la Loire" region
 15 "Centre" region
 6 "Aquitaine" region
 17 "Bretagne" region

See also
 List of high speed trains

References 

High-speed trains of France
Passenger trains running at least at 200 km/h in commercial operations
Electric multiple units of France
Transport express régional
25 kV AC multiple units
1500 V DC multiple units of France